Meitnerium (109Mt) is a synthetic element, and thus a standard atomic weight cannot be given. Like all synthetic elements, it has no stable isotopes. The first isotope to be synthesized was 266Mt in 1982, and this is also the only isotope directly synthesized; all other isotopes are only known as decay products of heavier elements. There are eight known isotopes, from 266Mt to 278Mt. There may also be two isomers. The longest-lived of the known isotopes is 278Mt with a half-life of 8 seconds. The unconfirmed heavier 282Mt appears to have an even longer half-life of 67 seconds.

List of isotopes 

|-
| 266Mt
| style="text-align:right" | 109
| style="text-align:right" | 157
| 266.137060(100)
| 
| α
| 262Bh
|
|-
| 268Mt
| style="text-align:right" | 109
| style="text-align:right" | 159
| 268.13865(25)#
| 
| α
| 264Bh
| 5+#, 6+#
|-
| style="text-indent:1em" | 268mMt
| colspan="3" style="text-indent:2em" | 0+X keV
| 
| α
| 264Bh
|
|-
| 270Mt
| style="text-align:right" | 109
| style="text-align:right" | 161
| 270.14033(18)#
| 
| α
| 266Bh
|
|-
| style="text-indent:1em" | 270mMt
| colspan="3" style="text-indent:2em" |
| 1.1 s?
| α
| 266Bh
|
|-
| 274Mt
| style="text-align:right" | 109
| style="text-align:right" | 165
| 274.14725(38)#
| 
| α
| 270Bh
|
|-
| 275Mt
| style="text-align:right" | 109
| style="text-align:right" | 166
| 275.14882(50)#
| 
| α
| 271Bh
|
|-
| 276Mt
| style="text-align:right" | 109
| style="text-align:right" | 167
| 276.15159(59)#
| 
| α
| 272Bh
|
|-
| 277Mt
| style="text-align:right" | 109
| style="text-align:right" | 168
| 277.15327(82)#
| ~5 ms
| SF
| (various)
| 
|-
| 278Mt
| style="text-align:right" | 109
| style="text-align:right" | 169
| 278.15631(68)#
| 
| α
| 274Bh
|
|-
| 282Mt
| style="text-align:right"| 109
| style="text-align:right"| 173
|
| 67 s?
| α
| 278Bh
|

Isotopes and nuclear properties

Nucleosynthesis
Super-heavy elements such as meitnerium are produced by bombarding lighter elements in particle accelerators that induce fusion reactions. Whereas the lightest isotope of meitnerium, meitnerium-266, can be synthesized directly this way, all the heavier meitnerium isotopes have only been observed as decay products of elements with higher atomic numbers.

Depending on the energies involved, the former are separated into "hot" and "cold". In hot fusion reactions, very light, high-energy projectiles are accelerated toward very heavy targets (actinides), giving rise to compound nuclei at high excitation energy (~40–50 MeV) that may either fission or evaporate several (3 to 5) neutrons. In cold fusion reactions, the produced fused nuclei have a relatively low excitation energy (~10–20 MeV), which decreases the probability that these products will undergo fission reactions. As the fused nuclei cool to the ground state, they require emission of only one or two neutrons, and thus, allows for the generation of more neutron-rich products. Nevertheless, the products of hot fusion tend to still have more neutrons overall. The latter is a distinct concept from that of where nuclear fusion claimed to be achieved at room temperature conditions (see cold fusion).

The table below contains various combinations of targets and projectiles which could be used to form compound nuclei with Z=109.

Cold fusion
After the first successful synthesis of meitnerium in 1982 by the GSI team, a team at the Joint Institute for Nuclear Research in Dubna, Russia, also tried to observe the new element by bombarding bismuth-209 with iron-58. In 1985 they managed to identity alpha decays from the descendant isotope 246Cf indicating the formation of meitnerium. The observation of a further two atoms of 266Mt from the same reaction was reported in 1988 and of another 12 in 1997 by the German team at GSI.

The same meitnerium isotope was also observed by the Russian team at Dubna in 1985 from the reaction:
 +  →  + 
by detecting the alpha decay of the descendant 246Cf nuclei. In 2007, an American team at the Lawrence Berkeley National Laboratory (LBNL) confirmed the decay chain of the 266Mt isotope from this reaction.

Hot fusion
In 2002–2003, the team at LBNL attempted to generate the isotope 271Mt to study its chemical properties by bombarding uranium-238 with chlorine-37, but without success. Another possible reaction that would form this isotope would be the fusion of berkelium-249 with magnesium-26; however, the yield for this reaction is expected to be very low due to the high radioactivity of the berkelium-249 target. Other potentially longer-lived isotopes were unsuccessfully targeted by a team at Lawrence Livermore National Laboratory (LLNL) in 1988 by bombarding einsteinium-254 with neon-22.

Decay products

All the isotopes of meitnerium except meitnerium-266 have been detected only in the decay chains of elements with a higher atomic number, such as roentgenium. Roentgenium currently has eight known isotopes; all but one of them undergo alpha decays to become meitnerium nuclei, with mass numbers between 268 and 282. Parent roentgenium nuclei can be themselves decay products of nihonium, flerovium, moscovium, livermorium, or tennessine. For example, in January 2010, the Dubna team (JINR) identified meitnerium-278 as a product in the decay of tennessine via an alpha decay sequence:

 →  + 
 →  + 
 →  + 
 →  +

Nuclear isomerism
270Mt
Two atoms of 270Mt have been identified in the decay chains of 278Nh. The two decays have very different lifetimes and decay energies and are also produced from two apparently different isomers of 274Rg. The first isomer decays by emission of an alpha particle with energy 10.03 MeV and has a lifetime of 7.16 ms. The other alpha decays with a lifetime of 1.63 s; the decay energy was not measured. An assignment to specific levels is not possible with the limited data available and further research is required.

268Mt
The alpha decay spectrum for 268Mt appears to be complicated from the results of several experiments. Alpha particles of energies 10.28, 10.22 and 10.10 MeV have been observed, emitted from 268Mt atoms with half-lives of 42 ms, 21 ms and 102 ms respectively. The long-lived decay must be assigned to an isomeric level. The discrepancy between the other two half-lives has yet to be resolved. An assignment to specific levels is not possible with the data available and further research is required.

Chemical yields of isotopes

Cold fusion
The table below provides cross-sections and excitation energies for cold fusion reactions producing meitnerium isotopes directly. Data in bold represent maxima derived from excitation function measurements. + represents an observed exit channel.

Theoretical calculations

Evaporation residue cross sections
The below table contains various targets-projectile combinations for which calculations have provided estimates for cross section yields from various neutron evaporation channels. The channel with the highest expected yield is given.

DNS = Di-nuclear system; HIVAP = heavy-ion vaporisation statistical-evaporation model; σ = cross section

References 

 Isotope masses from:

 Isotopic compositions and standard atomic masses from:

 Half-life, spin, and isomer data selected from the following sources.

 
Meitnerium
Meitnerium